Saw Sein Tun (born 9 December 1962) is a Burmese politician who currently serves as a House of Nationalities member of parliament for Kayah State № 4 constituency. He is a member of the National League for Democracy.

Early life and education 
Saw Sein Tun was born in Demoso Township, Kayah State on 9 December 1962. He is an ethnic Kayah. He graduated from Ywar Thit Gyi Development Institute. Previous employment is Education (Retd).

Political career 
He is a member of the National League for Democracy Party, he was elected as an Amyotha Hluttaw MP, winning a majority of 10030 votes and elected representative from Kayah State No. 4 parliamentary constituency.

References

National League for Democracy politicians
1962 births
Living people
People from Kayah State
Burmese people of Karen descent
Members of the House of Nationalities